Devereux Football Club is a football club based in Logan Town, Bushrod Island, Monrovia, Liberia. It was established in 1991 by friends of Silesia's brother Sean Devereux, a philanthropist who worked during the crisis in Liberia. Devereux F.C. is an affiliate of the Sean Devereux Children Foundation based in the United Kingdom; and associates with other Sean Devereux Programs in Liberia. The Club’s vision is "to transform street kids into career personnel through the means of soccer".

External links

Football clubs in Liberia
Sport in Monrovia
Association football clubs established in 1991
1991 establishments in Liberia